Love it or hate it is a marketing slogan for Marmite.

Hate it or love it may refer to:
 "Hate It or Love It", a single by The Game
 Hate It or Love It (album), an album by Chingy